The Cheyenne Flour Milling Company, also known as the Standard Oil Company and Salt Creek Freightways, is an early warehouse building in Cheyenne, Wyoming. The structure was built in 1927 to house goods brought to and from Cheyenne by the Union Pacific Railroad in an industrial section of Cheyenne as a flour mill, replacing structures that had performed similar functions since 1915. By 1931 the building was shared by a warehouse for electrical parts for the Mountain States Telephone and Telegraph Company, a potato chip factory and a chemical products company. In 1937-38 the Standard Oil Company started to use the warehouse for bulk petroleum products storage, continuing to 1963. From 1963 the building was used by Salt Creek Freightways, which had shared use from 1936. In 1973 it became a plumbing parts warehouse, and by 2003 was owned and used by a general contractor.

This section has a stepped parapet. Another brick addition abuts the connector, and appears to have been built as an office. Some of the masonry exhibits fire damage, attributed to its time as a potato chip factory. The facades retain a number of painted signs for the businesses that operated there.

The complex was placed on the National Register of Historic Places in 2003.

References

External links
 Cheyenne Flour Milling Company at the Wyoming State Historic Preservation Office

Commercial buildings on the National Register of Historic Places in Wyoming
Early Commercial architecture in the United States
Commercial buildings completed in 1915
Laramie County, Wyoming
Warehouses on the National Register of Historic Places